Fort Wheeling, or simply Wheeling, is the title of a comics series set in colonial North America, by Italian comics creator Hugo Pratt.

Publication history
Wheeling first appeared in the Argentine comics magazine Misterix in 1962. The series has since 1972 been reprinted in several editions, among these collections by publishers Florenzo Ivaldi, Casterman and Les Humanoïdes Associés.

Synopsis
Patrick Fitzgerald, aristocrat, and Chris Kenton, Virginian, are young soldiers serving on the frontier of Great Britain's American colonies just prior to the American Revolution.  During the French and Indian war they fall in love with the beautiful Mohena, a captive rescued from the Shawnee Indians.  When the American Revolution begins, however, the two friends choose different sides.

Sources

External links
 Fort Wheeling French album publications Bedetheque 
 Page sur Fort Wheeling du site www.archivespratt.com

Italian comic strips
Argentine comic strips
1962 comics debuts
1981 comics endings
Western (genre) comics
Comics set during the American Revolutionary War
Comics by Hugo Pratt